Burnfoot is a small village on the Inishowen peninsula in County Donegal, Ireland. It lies within the townland of Ballyderowen. It has a few local shops and a pub. , the population was 450.

There is a small industrial estate which, among other firms, houses E&I Engineering, a major local employer with over 300 employees. Burnfoot is also home to Wild Ireland, an animal sanctuary that includes Irish bears, wolves and monkeys.

References

Towns and villages in County Donegal